The Harley-Davidson RR350, also known as the Harley-Davidson 350RR, was a racing motorcycle, designed, developed, and built by Harley-Davidson, conforming to the 350cc class regulations of the Grand Prix motorcycle racing world championship, between 1974 and 1976.

References

RR250
Grand Prix motorcycles
Motorcycles introduced in 1974